Charops ( Χάρωψ ) or Charopus may refer to:

 Charops (mythology), several Greek mythological characters
 Charops of Epirus (2nd century BC), two statesmen (grandfather and grandson)
 Charops (Decennial archon) (753 BC), Eupatridae who was the first Decennial Archon
 Charops (wasp), a genus of insects in the tribe Campoplegini

Charopus may refer to:
 Charopus (beetle), a genus of insects in the subfamily Malachiinae